Mabie is a surname. Notable people with the surname include:

Benjamin H. Mabie, American politician
Don Mabie (born 1947), Canadian artist
Hamilton Wright Mabie (1846–1916), American essayist, editor, critic, and lecturer